2030 – Aufstand der Alten (2030 – Rise of the Elderly) is a three-part German television miniseries which aired in January 2007.

The first part is titled "Die Geiselnahme (Taking a Hostage)", the second is titled "Das Leben im Untergrund (Living in the Underground)", and the third is titled "Das Geheimnis in der Wüste (Tower of the Firstborn)".

Cast
 Bettina Zimmermann: Lena Bach
 Jürgen Schornagel: Sven Darow

External links
 

2000s German television miniseries
2000s German-language films
German-language television shows
2007 German television series debuts
2007 German television series endings
German science fiction television series
Dystopian television series